Shivering Timbers is a wooden roller coaster located at Michigan's Adventure in Muskegon County, Michigan. It was developed and built by Custom Coasters International. Opened in May 1998, Shivering Timbers debuted for the park's 32nd year in operation and was a success. Construction for the ride began in 1997. The trains were made by Philadelphia Toboggan Coasters. The ride has been re-tracked by Martin & Vleminckx and Great Coasters International. Shivering Timbers is the tallest and fastest roller coaster in Michigan.

Ride experience 
The ride starts with a left turn out of the station and onto the  lift hill. Following the lift hill are two camelback hills. In both, riders experience "ejector air-time". The train then jumps a bunny hop and another camelback hill and a double uphill, before turning around for the second half of its course. After the turnaround, the train hits another bunny hop and another double uphill. After the double uphill, there is a series of six bunny hop hills. After the last hill, there is an on-ride photo camera and the ride's finale, a 630-degree helix, in which riders experience lateral g-force. After the helix, the train slides onto the final brake run and executes a U-turn back into the station.

Incidents 

On June 19, 2021, a train with guests was stopped by the ride's computer on the final emergency brakes set on the brake run after slipping past the first set due to persistent rain. Maintenance arrived shortly on the scene and deactivated the E-Stop. This caused the emergency brakes to disengage and released the stopped train, thus colliding with the second empty train in the station. The collision was not at high speed, and none of the guests faced severe injuries. The ride was closed afterward for two weeks to repair and reinforce the damaged track caused by the collision. The ride was later reopened on July 3, 2021, with only one train in operation. The ride has since gone back to having two trains in operation for the 2022 season.

Rankings

Shivering Timbers has been consistently ranked as being among the best wooden roller coasters.

References

External links

Official page

Out and back roller coasters
Roller coasters in Michigan
Roller coasters introduced in 1998
Michigan's Adventure
Roller coasters operated by Cedar Fair